Macklin is a town in Eye Hill Rural Municipality No. 382, Saskatchewan, Canada. The population was 1,247 at the 2021 Canadian census.

Among its many attractions, it is the host of the annual Bunnock World Championship, during which the town population doubles in size.

Demographics 

Notable people
 Jeremy Hunt, cyclist
 Agnes Martin, painter

See also

 List of communities in Saskatchewan
 Towns in Saskatchewan

References

External links

Eye Hill No. 382, Saskatchewan
Towns in Saskatchewan
Division No. 13, Saskatchewan